Maailma on tehty meitä varten is the fourth studio album of the Finnish pop rock band Haloo Helsinki!. It was released on 8 February 2013 by Ratas Music Group. In its first week of release, the album debuted at number two on the Finnish Albums Chart and peaked at number one in its 26th week. The album charted for 69 weeks. In a month from its release, the album had sold gold according to the radio station The Voice and according to Turun Sanomat the album had sold platinum by late August 2013, with officially certified sales of 32,000 copies to date.

Singles
Two singles have been released so far: "Huuda!", released on 30 November 2012, peaked at number eight on the Finnish Singles Chart and the second single "Vapaus käteen jää", released on 1 February 2013, reached number two and had sold gold by late August 2013. The title track was released as a radio-only promotional single on 23 May 2013 and peaked at number 14 on the Finnish Singles Chart.

Track listing

Charts and certifications

Weekly charts

Certifications

See also
List of number-one albums of 2013 (Finland)

References

2013 albums
Haloo Helsinki! albums
Finnish-language albums